The Salinas Pueblo Missions National Monument is a complex of three Spanish missions located in the U.S. state of New Mexico, near Mountainair. The main park visitor center is in Mountainair. Construction of the missions began in 1622 and was completed in 1635.

History

Once, thriving Native American trade communities of Tiwa and Tompiro language-speaking Pueblo people inhabited this remote frontier area of central New Mexico. Early in the 17th century Spanish Franciscans found the area ripe for their missionary efforts. However, by the late 1670s the entire Salinas District, as the Spanish had named it, was depopulated of both Indian and Spaniard. What remains today are austere yet beautiful reminders of this earliest contact between Pueblo Indians and Spanish Colonials: the ruins of three mission churches, at Quarai, Abó, and Gran Quivira and the partially excavated pueblo of Las Humanas or, as it is known today, the Gran Quivira pueblo.

The site was first proclaimed Gran Quivira National Monument on November 1, 1909. Administered by the National Park Service, the National Monument for this site was listed on the National Register of Historic Places on October 15, 1966. On December 19, 1980, the footprint of the site was enlarged two include two New Mexico State Monuments on November 2, 1981. The enlarged site was renamed on October 28, 1988.

Quarai Ruins

The Quarai Ruins are located about 8 miles north of Mountainair, at about 6650 feet (2026 m) above sea level. There is a visitor center and a 0.5 mile (0.8 km) trail through the ruins. In a forest, an interpretive sign reads that when Francis Gardes traveled through the area, he heard birds sing a song called "When Explorers Came". Francis Gardes's trail became Francis Garde National Historic Trail, and it passes through Quarai.

Abó Ruins

The Abo Pueblo community was established in the 11th century on the edge of the existing pueblo culture, and often attracted roaming Nomadic Tribes of the eastern plains.
 
San Gregorio de Abó Mission (located in Mountainair, New Mexico) was one of three Spanish missions constructed in or near the pueblos of central New Mexico. These missions, built in 1600s, are now a part of the Salinas Pueblo National Monument which includes San Gregorio de Abó Mission, Quarai and Gran Quivera.

The mission at Abo was established in 1625 by Fray Francisco Fonte.

Gran Quivira Ruins

The Gran Quivira Ruins are located about 25 miles south of Mountainair, at about 6500 feet (1981 m) above sea level. There is a small visitor center near the parking lot. A 0.5-mile (0.8 km) trail leads through partially excavated pueblo ruins and the ruins of the uncompleted mission church.

The Gran Quivera Historic District was listed separately on the National Register of Historic Places in 2015.

Gallery

See also

National Register of Historic Places listings in Socorro County, New Mexico
National Register of Historic Places listings in Torrance County, New Mexico
List of National Historic Landmarks in New Mexico
List of national monuments of the United States

References

Further reading

External links

Official NPS website: Salinas Pueblo Missions National Monument
 American Southwest, a National Park Service Discover Our Shared Heritage Travel Itinerary
Gran Quivira: A Blending of Cultures in a Pueblo Indian Village, a National Park Service Teaching with Historic Places (TwHP) lesson plan

Archaeological sites in New Mexico
Archaeological sites on the National Register of Historic Places in New Mexico
Spanish missions in New Mexico
National Park Service National Monuments in New Mexico
Ruins in the United States
Properties of religious function on the National Register of Historic Places in New Mexico
Archaeological museums in New Mexico
Protected areas established in 1909
Museums in Torrance County, New Mexico
Museums in Socorro County, New Mexico
Native American museums in New Mexico
Protected areas of Socorro County, New Mexico
Protected areas of Torrance County, New Mexico
1909 establishments in New Mexico Territory
Historic districts on the National Register of Historic Places in New Mexico
National Register of Historic Places in Torrance County, New Mexico
National Register of Historic Places in Socorro County, New Mexico

es:Monumento Nacional Misión Salinas Pueblo#top